Ellington a la Carte is a live album by guitarist Kenny Burrell recorded in New York in 1983 but not released on the Muse label until 1993.

Reception

The Allmusic review said "The playing is excellent and the interplay creative in a subtle way, but nothing out of the ordinary or particularly memorable occurs. However Kenny Burrell fans will enjoy this".

Track listing 
 "Take the "A" Train" (Billy Strayhorn) – 4:20
 "Sultry Serenade" (Tyree Glenn) – 6:49
 "Flamingo" (Ted Grouya, Edmund Anderson) – 4:27    
 "In a Mellow Tone" (Duke Ellington, Milt Gabler) – 5:28
 "Don't Worry 'Bout Me" (Rube Bloom, Ted Koehler) – 7:08
 "Ellington Medley: Azure/I Ain't Got Nothin' but the Blues/Do Nothing till You Hear from Me/Mood Indigo" (Ellington, Irving Mills/Ellington, Don George/Ellington, Bob Russell/Ellington, Barney Bigard, Mills) – 11:20
 "Blues for Duke" (Kenny Burrell) – 4:07

Personnel 
Kenny Burrell – acoustic guitar, electric guitar
Rufus Reid – bass

References 

Kenny Burrell live albums
1993 live albums
Muse Records live albums
Duke Ellington tribute albums